Alex Thomson (born 18 April 1974, Bangor, Wales) is a British yachtsman.

Alex Thomson was helped early in his sailing career by Sir Keith Mills, the British businessman who ran London's victorious bid to host the 2012 Olympic Games and Paralympic Games and set up with British America's Cup campaign TEAMORIGIN. With Mills' backing, Thomson broke into the professional solo sailing circuit at a young age.

Thomson's Clipper Race win in 1999 made him the youngest skipper ever to win a round-the-world yacht race.  he still holds this record. He is an around the world solo sailor, and holds the 24-hour world speed sailing record for solo mono-hulls (537 nautical miles at an average speed of 22.4 knots).

Sponsored by Hugo Boss he took part in the Vendée Globe 2004/05 but was forced to retire after damage to the carbon fitting that attached the boom to the deck. He also started in 2008, but had to retire from the race after a cracked hull. He was third in 2012 and second in the 2016 edition. During the latter edition, Thomson set new fastest reference times from Les Sables d'Olonne to the Equator (9 days 7 h 02 min) and the Cape of Good Hope (17 days 22 h 58 min).

However, 13 days into the race Hugo Boss's starboard foil broke after hitting an unidentified floating object, therefore hampering Alex's progress throughout the rest of the course. Of note, most of the race takes place on port tack, that is, the boat would have made good use of the missing starboard foil. Despite his foil and anemometer/autopilot problems, Thomson finished the race with the second fastest time on record – 74 days 19 h 35 min 15 sec, 16h behind Armel Le Cléac'h.

In the 2019 Transat Jacques Vabre race, Thomson's $7.7 million racing yacht was struck by a submerged object, forcing Thomson and his co-skipper Neal McDonald to make repairs in order to stabilise the boat.

Career highlights

Boats owned

Records 

 2007: Monohull (up to 60 feet) 24-hour distance record with Andrew Cape: 501.3 nautical miles
 2012: Monohull (up to 60 feet) singlehanded transatlantic sailing record: 8 days 21 hours 8 minutes and 31 seconds
 2017: Monohull singlehanded 24-hour distance record: 536.8 nautical miles
 2018: Route du Rhum IMOCA60 Class 11 days 23 hours 10 minutes 58 seconds

References

External links
 

1974 births
Living people
Single-handed sailors
Single-handed circumnavigating sailors
Sportspeople from Bangor, Gwynedd
2004 Vendee Globe sailors
2008 Vendee Globe sailors
2012 Vendee Globe sailors
2016 Vendee Globe sailors
2020 Vendee Globe sailors
Vendée Globe finishers
British Vendee Globe sailors
Sailing teams
IMOCA 60 class sailors
Welsh male sailors (sport)